Harold Judson Osterhof (27 November 1897 – 13 May 1982) was a chemist noted for directing the development of Natsyn, and as the inventor of Pliofilm, a plasticized rubber hydrochloride cast film.

Osterhof obtained his MS in Chemistry in 1923 from the University of Michigan, and his PhD in 1927.  In 1929, he began his career at the Goodyear Tire & Rubber Company, from which he retired as Director of Research in 1966.

In 1971, Osterhof received the Charles Goodyear Medal.

References

University of Michigan alumni
Polymer scientists and engineers
1897 births
1982 deaths
20th-century American inventors
Goodyear Tire and Rubber Company people